Boreman is a surname. Notable people with the surname include:

Arthur I. Boreman (1823–1896), the first governor of the US state of West Virginia
Herbert Stephenson Boreman (1897–1982), United States federal judge
Jacob S. Boreman (1831–1913), Justice of the Supreme Court of the Utah Territory
Laurane Tanner Bullock Boreman (1830–1904), the wife of former Governor of West Virginia Arthur I. Boreman
Linda Susan Boreman (1949–2002), early pornographic actress.

See also
Boreman, West Virginia
Boreman Hall, a residence hall on the campus of West Virginia University in Morgantown, West Virginia
Borman